Mind Sports South Africa (MSSA) is recognised by Act of Parliament as the national controlling body for mind sports in South Africa.

Mind Sports South Africa (MSSA) is also an affiliate of the International eSports Federation, Fédération Mondiale du Jeu de Dames, and the International Wargames Federation. Due to its membership of such international bodies, the MSSA is the sole authority for the games that it caters for in terms of the Sport and Recreation Act, number 110 of 1998 (as amended).

History
Mind Sports South Africa was formally constituted on 14 December 1985. However, it was not until 1990 that the MSSA became a member of NOCSA in 1990, and in 1991 that the MSSA became affiliated to the Confederation of South African Sports Confederation (COSAS).

The MSSA was one of the members that encouraged unity during the apartheid era, and thus voted in favour of the unifying of sport. As a consequence of the actions of the many National Federations, the National Sports Council was formed in 1994 and was immediately accepted as a full member of the newly formed body. Upon dissolution of the NSC in 1999, the MSSA played its part in supporting the formation of the South African Sports Commission in 1999.

Once the South African Sports Commission was formed (by Act of Parliament) the MSSA again was accepted as a full member. Even when the Minister of Sport and Recreation saw the need to ask Parliament to amend the Sports and Recreation Act (number110 of 1998), the official recognition of Mind Sports South Africa remained unchanged as the MSSA became a founding member of the South African Sports Confederation and Olympic Committee (SASCOC).

All the games promoted by Mind Sports South Africa are accredited as national sports. Such accreditation by the Sports and Recreation Act (number110 of 1998), guarantees the MSSA as being the only authority for the administration and control of the games that fall under the MSSA's jurisdiction.

The MSSA changed its name in 2005 from the South African Wargames Union (SAWU) to that of Mind Sports South Africa.

Structure 
Mind Sports South Africa, like other sports federations in South Africa, is constituted as a voluntary association.

The highest authority of the MSSA is the Annual General Meeting which holds all Committees accountable for their actions.

The executive committee meets a minimum of twice a year, and requires a full report from the management board.

The management board deals with the day-to-day operations of the MSSA and overseas the different Boards of Control. Clubs are directly affiliated to the MSSA which ensures that there is greater transparency and inclusion.

History of the emblem
Back in the early 1990s, the South African Wargames Union (as the MSSA was then known) was invited to participate in the World Team Championships for Wargames. Up until that point the MSSA used the rampant lion as its symbol. However, it was felt by the committee to approach the State Herald to design something specifically for the MSSA that best represented the games as administered by the MSSA. The State Herald Frederick Brownell designed the Janus Knight for the MSSA.

The logo is made up of the following aspects:

The double-headed knight chess piece:
The knight chess piece is already an international symbol for army battle school. The symbol represents tactical and strategic thought and training. By making the symbol a double-headed knight, it also incorporates the concepts of considering the opponent's moves and shows the mental versatility of gamers.

The circle:
The circle represents the rules to which all the games are played, and the unity of all the games that the MSSA represents.

Disciplines and games under the jurisdiction of the MSSA
In terms of its Constitution, Mind Sports South Africa caters for a wide variety of Mind Sports in South Africa, such as:

Board gaming
 Backgammon
 Draughts (Anglo-American, Pool Checkers and International)
 Morabaraba (also known as Mlabalaba)
 Moruba
 SesothoMorabaraba
 Speed Stacking
Card gaming

Figure gaming
 Ancients 		(3000 BC to 1500 AD)
 Pike & Shot 		(1500 AD to 1700 AD)
 Horse & Musket  	(1700 to 1845)
 World War II  	        (1939 to 1945)
eSports
 Console gaming 
 Mobile gaming
 PSP gaming
 Personal computer gaming
Robotics

How games are chosen
Every year the MSSA holds an Annual General Meeting (AGM)directly after the South African National Championships. It is at such AGM that the games to be played in the Esports Discipline are selected by the member clubs.

Esports titles to be played at 2021 Provincial and National Championships

Esports titles to be played at 2021 Online School Championships

Esports titles to be played at 2021 High School LAN Provincial and National Championships

State awards
 In 2002, David Hlophe received the President's Award (Silver Class) from the President, Mr Thabo Mbeki, at the President's residence in Cape Town.
 In 2003, Rhonnie Manana and Thabo Mokoena were finalists at the South African Sports Awards.
 In 2007, Berneice Ligault and Amanda Kwaza were also finalists at the South African Sports Awards.
 in 2013, Simphiwe Maphumulo was the recipient of the Indigenous Sports Star of the Year award at the S A Sports Awards.

Other awards
 In 2005, Colin Webster was a recipient of the Ekuhurleni Outstanding Sports Administrator Award
 In 2010, Barry Booysen was a recipient of the Ekuhurleni Volunteer of the Year Award
 In 2013, Morizane Boyes was the recipient of the Volunteer of the Year Award at the Spar GSport Awards
 In 2014, Lubabalo Kondlo was a finalist in the Eastern Cape Provincial Sportsman of the Year Awards
 In 2014, Kyle Wolmarans was a finalist in the Eastern Cape Provincial Media Person of the Year Awards

Management Board Awards

World champions produced

South Africa has produced the following world champions:

Medal winners 
South Africa has produced the following medal winners in international championships:

World Championships attended

Official Ranking after IeSF World Championships

Official eSports Tri-Nation Test matches 
The following online events were held by member associations and under the jurisdiction of the IeSF:

Official Test matches 
The following Test matches were held:

IESF Good governance ranking

Committee members 
MSSA has had the following committee members for the period 2005 to present:

South Africans who have served on international committees
The following South Africans have served on international committees:

Affiliations to international federations 
Mind Sport South Africa is affiliated to the following international federations:

 International eSports Federation
 International Wargames Federation
 World Draughts Federation FMJD

References

External links

South African Sports Confederation and Olympic Committee
The International Wargames Federation
The FMJD 
International eSports Federation
Mind Sports South Africa 
GSports for Girls
Parliamentary Monitoring Group for Sport and Recreation "Report back from the MSSA to the South African Parliament"
Sports Trader
ANC Newsbrief
Mail & Guardian "SA leads gaming industry"
ITWeb
News today
Witness This
Roodepoort News
Northcliff Melville News
Sandton News
Centurion News
MWEB
Mind sports in South Africa stronger than ever in 2011
Witness Newspaper PMB game ace aiming high
Sports Trader MSSA sues South African Minister of Sport
Die Beeld (A national Afrikaans newspaper)
Die Beeld MSSA lays corruption charges against South African Minister of Sport
Die Beeld "Barry Booysen wins award from Erkurhuleni City Council"
 Esports Tournaments

Sports science
Games of mental skill
Sport in South Africa
Sports governing bodies in South Africa
Esports governing bodies
Draughts organizations
Organisations based in Germiston